Destruction Derby Raw is a video game for the PlayStation and is the third installment of the Destruction Derby series. It was developed by Studio 33 and was released in 2000.

The game was released after Destruction Derby (1995) and Destruction Derby 2 (1996). Raw was added to the PlayStation Platinum Range on 15 February 2002.

Modes
The following are the modes in the game:

Wrecking Racing
In Wrecking Racing, there are 25 'tough and gruelling' real race-tracks to race and to demolition. The objective is to destroy or "wreck" the other competitors while racing, for which points are earned, in addition to points earned from racing.

In nearly every race, there are 19 competitors, although some races have 15 competitors.

Points are earned according to race placement, with the winner gaining 1000 points, first runner up earns 900 points, and so on. No race points are earned if the player finishes outside 9th place.

In every race, there is a 'required points' section. This means that in every race, there is a require points. Only those players earning more than the required number of points in a race passes the stage.

Smash 4 $
Smash 4 $ means 'Smash for cash', an all new career mode where cars have to be purchased and upgraded. This mode is the same as Championship. The objective is to collect money by winning races and then use that prize money to upgrade better, faster cars in order to win more advanced cars with which to race.

Race cars must be purchased. To begin with, not all vehicles are immediately affordable; race success will win rewards with which players can start buying more powerful vehicles. The races are divided into different skill levels and different types of cars, with the harder races carrying higher the prize money.

Once a new Championship begins, players must equip their garages with a car. During the championship, players can adopt a strategy of adding more cars to their garages with the prospect of upgrading each car differently. They can then select the car most suitable for the next race. The cost of each car is directly proportional to its performance. To join a race, the player must select a car that meets the minimum requirement of having all damage cars repaired.

The game ends when the player's cars are all destroyed and the player does not have sufficient money to purchase another racer.

Battle
Battle has the real demolition mode, and has a total of 4 modes as following:

Assault
Assault is team mode, with the emphasis on protecting your team-mate. There are 2 vehicles per team and your partner is a CPU-controlled armour-plated Hummers, which are very strong, but also very cumbersome.

The aim is to prevent the other CPU cars from attacking your teammate, while simultaneously trying to slow down your opponents' Hummer. Extra points are earned when a player helps his/her partner to retain a high race position for a period of time (5-second multiples):  40 points for every 5 seconds in first place; 30 points for second; 20 for third, and 10 for fourth.

The Hummers are difficult to manoeuvre, and their speed may be difficult to control. Players may resort to head-on collisions, but these will cause damage to vehicles; if a car is destroyed, a player will no longer be able to help his/her team-mate.

Skyscraper
The objective here, in addition to picking up points in the usual way, is for the player to shunt opponents off the roof of a towering skyscraper.

Pass Da Bomb
Bombs will be dealt out at random, with variable fuse lengths and explosive strength, and the objective is to pass it on before it explodes. A new bomb is introduced to the fray as long there are more free cars than bombs. The device with greatest destructive potential has 5 sticks of dynamite and the longest fuse. Points are awarded for actually holding on to a bomb, thus players are motivated to retain a bomb for just long enough time. If a player gets a given bomb, a dynamite icon and countdown timer will appear.

Destruction Derby
This mode is total car carnage. The player must, in all three modes, race around one of the three bowl tracks inflicting as much damage as possible to opponents' vehicles, while maintaining his/her own.

Armageddon
The player has 19 opponents who are all attempting to destroy his/her vehicle. The player must stay alive (by sustaining minimal damage to his/her car) for as long as possible with the timer clicking away.

Classic
This is the classic demolition mode, where the player needs to slam cars to get points.

Vampyre
In this mode, players obtain points off their opponents they attack. Points are transferred directly from the car attacked.

Cars

Bonus cars
As well as normal cars, there are also bonus cars that can be unlocked (one by one) if a player finishes and wins the last Stage of each level in Wrecking Racing.

Points system
Each championship mode race uses a points system. The maximum number of points available is 9999, and is only possible in Skyscraper. The lowest single score is 10 points for a minor bump; 1000 points may be awarded if a player creates 'combo carnage'.

Reception

The game received "average" reviews according to the review aggregation website Metacritic. Chet Barber of NextGen, however, said that the game was "exactly the same as the first two in the series, but with some new problems included."

Notes

References

External links

2000 video games
Midway video games
PlayStation (console) games
PlayStation (console)-only games
Racing video games
Sony Interactive Entertainment games
Video games developed in the United Kingdom